was a JR East railway station located in Kesennuma, Miyagi Prefecture, Japan. The station was destroyed by the 2011 Tōhoku earthquake and tsunami and has now been replaced by a provisional bus rapid transit line.

Lines
Shishiori-Karakuwa Station was served by the Ōfunato Line, and is located 64.2 rail kilometers from the terminus of the line at Ichinoseki Station.

Station layout
Shishiori-Karakuwa Station had a single side platform serving a single bi-directional track. The station was unattended.

History
It was renamed to its present name on 1 November 1986. The station was absorbed into the JR East network upon the privatization of the Japan National Railways (JNR) on April 1, 1987. The station was completely destroyed by the 11 March 2011 Tōhoku earthquake and tsunami.

Surrounding area
 Kesennuma Shishiori Elementary School
 Kesennuma Shishiori Middle School
 Kesennuma Shishiori Post Office

External links

  

Railway stations in Miyagi Prefecture
Ōfunato Line
Railway stations in Japan opened in 1932
Railway stations closed in 2011
Kesennuma